Stephanie Hodge (born December 24, 1956) is an American actress and stand-up comedian, known for her roles as Nurse Sandy Miller in the NBC sitcom Nurses from 1991 to 1993, and as Jennie Malloy on the WB sitcom Unhappily Ever After from 1995 to 1998.

Early life and career 
Hodge was born in Wilmington, Ohio, the daughter of a college professor and schoolteacher. She attended Wilmington College and Ohio University in Athens, OH. In 1980s, she began working as a stand-up comedian, and appeared in films including Big Top Pee-wee (1988) and I, Madman (1989). In 1990, Hodge made her television debut with co-starring role on the short-lived CBS sitcom Sugar and Spice. Later, she starred alongside Cynthia Stevenson in the syndicated variety comedy My Talk Show. In 1991, she released her stand-up comedy special, Stephanie Hodge: Straight Up.

In 1991, Hodge went to star in the NBC sitcom Nurses, the spin-off of for The Golden Girls. The show was created by Susan Harris as a star vehicle for Hodge, but later was more ensemble cast. She left the series in 1993, after two seasons. The following year, she went to star in the CBS sitcom Muddling Through playing the role of ex-convict trying to turn her life around. The series received negative reviews and was canceled after one season. In 1995, she began starring alongside Geoff Pierson in The WB sitcom Unhappily Ever After. The series was initially supposed to be a starring vehicle for Hodge, whose character Jennie was the focus of the first few episodes. The series concept was later re-worked. By the show's third season, Nikki Cox became a breakout character. The producers tried to kill off Jennie's increasingly-unnecessary character and return her as a ghost; negative audience reaction made them quickly reverse this action. The character was brought back to life in a deliberately-bizarre sequence in which a network executive wandered onto the set and announced that she was no longer dead. Nevertheless, Hodge decided to leave the show in 1998, and several episodes after Jennie's bizarre reappearance, she abandoned her family for a lesbian lover and was never seen again.
 
After leaving Unhappily Ever After, Hodge appeared in the 2001 science fiction film Evolution. The following years, she guest-starred in a number of sitcoms, including Reba, The Suite Life of Zack and Cody, The War at Home, Dog with a Blog, and on several episodes of Funny or Die. Her dramatic credits include NCIS, Bones, Scandal and The Rookie.

Personal life 
She has been married to Lance Lyon since 1992. They have one daughter named Harper.

Filmography

References

External links

1956 births
American stand-up comedians
American television actresses
Living people
People from Wilmington, Ohio
American women comedians
Wilmington College (Ohio) alumni
Ohio University alumni
20th-century American actresses
21st-century American actresses
Comedians from Ohio
20th-century American comedians
21st-century American comedians